Gynnidomorpha permixtana, the coast conch, is a moth of the family Tortricidae. The species was first described in 1775 by the Austrian lepidopterists, Michael Denis and Ignaz Schiffermüller. The moth is found in Asia and Europe.

Distribution
It is found in China (Anhui, Beijing, Fujian, Gansu, Guizhou, Hainan, Hebei, Heilongjiang, Henan, Hubei, Liaoning, Ningxia, Shaanxi, Shandong, Shanghai, Shanxi, Sichuan, Tianjin, Xizang, Zhejiang), Afghanistan, Iran, Japan, Korea, Mongolia, Russia, Sri Lanka and Europe. The habitat consists of waste ground, damp heathland and mosses.

Description
The wingspan is 8–12 mm and they are on the wing nearly all year round. Very similar to Phalonidia manniana Fischer von Röslerstamm, 1839. It differs as follows: forewings with markings broader, more indistinct and suffused, median fascia marked with dark fuscous on posterior edge in middle.

The larvae feed in the stems of water-plantains (Alisma species), gentians (Gentiana species), eyebrights (Euphrasia species) and  louseworts (Pedicularis species).

Life cycle

References

Cochylini
Moths described in 1775
Moths of Asia
Taxa named by Michael Denis
Taxa named by Ignaz Schiffermüller
Tortricidae of Europe